Miami Country Day School (MCDS) is a private, non-denominational, co-ed Preschool–12 college preparatory school in unincorporated Miami-Dade County, near Miami Shores, just north of the city of Miami. The school has been named a Blue Ribbon School of Excellence. Mariandl Hufford is the institution's Head of School.

History 
Miami Country Day School began in 1938 as an elementary boarding school for boys and was founded by Luther B. Sommers and C.W. Abele. In the early years, the school was known as The Miami Country Day and Resident School for Boys. Through the 1950s and 1960s, day students were enrolled.

In the 1970s, Miami Country Day became co-educational and the boarding program was phased out. The boarding rooms were converted into classrooms to make space for the growing student body. Originally a K-8 program, the school expanded to include an Upper School and graduated its first 12th-grade class in 1981. The "Spartans" began to participate in a wide variety of competitive sports such as golf, soccer and volleyball.

Academics 
The school's enrollment is approximately 1,280 students. Class size in the Lower School ranges from 8–24 depending on grade level. Annual tuition varies by grade and ranges from $24,000 to $37,000.

The school has a large international student community. With 47% of its students born abroad (and more than 75% of parents born abroad), MCDS is one of the most international schools in Miami and features an extensive language department.

MCDS's team for the Junior Engineering Technical Society TEAMS competition has, for two years in a row, ranked nationally. In 2007 MCDS was the 1st-place winner of the competition and in 2008 the JETS team placed 20th in their division.

Athletics 
The following sports are offered to boys at Miami Country Day School: 

The following sports are offered to girls at Miami Country Day School:

Athletics administration and staff 

 Chuck W. Sennett, director of athletics, BB (admin) 
 Bryan Parizo, associate athletic director, Golf
 Christopher Mark Hayes, middle school athletic director, XC 
 Anthony Haderer, assistant athletic director
 Chris L. Polite, assistant athletic director, FB
 Eric Scheingoltz, director of aquatics, USA Swimming & Interscholastic head coach, swim, WP 
 Aristides Atoa, strength and conditioning coordinator 
 Michelle A. Cordero, head athletic trainer, MS, ATC
 Anthony Reyes, assistant athletic trainer
 Joseph Hernandez, office manager

Athletic history 

 2006 varsity football team had one of the top 10 ranked offense in the state of Florida, regional playoffs appearance.
 2014-2019 six consecutive Florida State champions in girls high school basketball 
 2013, 2014 girls basketball coach Ochiel Swaby and player Danielle Minott named coach and player of the year by Miami Herald
 2014 girls basketball team- Ranked #11 in the nation by USA Today December 2014
 2015 girls basketball team wins Dick's National Championship in New York 
 2008 boys water polo regional champions
 2008 water polo team reached state semi-finals
 2008 girls basketball team were regional finalists
 2008 boys varsity soccer team has been district champion for three of the last four years
 2007 boys lacrosse district champions
 2009 girls water polo district champions
 1992, 2011 boys varsity basketball made it to the regional finals
 1992, 2013, 2014, 2015, and 2016 girls varsity soccer district champions; 2015 regional champions
 2006, 2014 girls softball district champions
 2013–2014 girls/boys tennis district champions
 2014, 2006, 2007 girls volleyball district champions
 2014 boys/girls cross country teams ranked #9 in state of Florida

Facilities 
A state of the art Media and resources center with a broadcast studio, a 4 tier parking garage and the over 40,000 square foot Center for the Arts housing The John Davies Theater.

Accreditation and membership 
Miami Country Day School is accredited or a member of the following organizations: 
 Southern Association of Colleges and Schools
 Southern Association of Independent Schools
 Florida Council of Independent Schools
 Florida Kindergarten Council
 National Association of Independent Schools
 National Association of College Admission Counseling
 Southern Association of College Admission Counseling
 National Association of Secondary School Principals
 American Library Association
 Secondary School Admissions Test Board
 Educational Records Bureau
 College Board
 Council for Advancement and Support of Education

Notable alumni 

 Roy Altman, United States District Judge for the Southern District of Florida 
 Christian Gaddis, NFL player
 Zoe Kravitz, actress/singer
 Natasha Lyonne, actress
 Sandon Stolle, professional tennis player
 Briny Baird, professional golfer
 Navi Rawat, actress
 Manny Diaz, head coach at the University of Miami
 Marco Rodriguez, music producer and disc jockey
 Lele Pons, comedian and singer
 Emily Estefan, musician

References

External links 
 

Education in Miami
Private K-12 schools in Miami-Dade County, Florida
Preparatory schools in Florida
Educational institutions established in 1938
1938 establishments in Florida